Nemouria: Occasional Papers of the Delaware Museum of Natural History is a peer-reviewed scientific journal covering natural history that is published by the Delaware Museum of Natural History. It was established in 1970.

The journal mainly focuses on molluscs and birds, but occasionally publishes papers on other topics, relating to North America or a region well represented in the museum's collection, such as the Indo-West Pacific or Philippines.

References

External links

Archive and statistics at BioStor
Biology journals
Academic journals published by non-profit organizations of the United States
1970 establishments in Delaware
English-language journals
Publications established in 1970
Academic journals published by museums